Gregory Williscroft (born 10 February 1966) is a Canadian volleyball player. He competed in the men's tournament at the 1992 Summer Olympics.

References

External links
 

1966 births
Living people
Canadian men's volleyball players
Olympic volleyball players of Canada
Volleyball players at the 1992 Summer Olympics
Sportspeople from Townsville